Arbroath 36–0 Bon Accord is the result of a football match between Arbroath and Bon Accord which took place on 12 September 1885. 

It held the largest margin of victory in professional football until the 31 October 2002 match between AS Adema and SO l'Emyrne, but that was a thrown game; this match therefore remains, as of 2023, the largest victory margin in a competitive game.

The referee for this match was Dave Stormont.

Background
Arbroath were drawn against Bon Accord in the first round of the Scottish Cup which was played on 12 September 1885. The lot gave Bon Accord home advantage, but the club decided to switch the tie to Gayfield.

Although Arbroath were only founded seven years earlier in 1878, they were already vastly more experienced than Bon Accord who were only a year old. Some sources state that Bon Accord were really Orion Cricket Club, who had received the entry confirmation from the Scottish FA instead of Orion FC. However, in reality Bon Accord had been formed in 1884 as a bona fide football club, while Orion FC were not formed until October 1885, well after the opening rounds of the Scottish Cup had been played.
"Bon Accord" was used to commemorate the watchword that initiated the storming of the Castle of Aberdeen during the Wars of Scottish Independence. At the time, any Scottish-based team could enter the Cup without any previous experience.

A record-breaking game
Bon Accord are said to have arrived for the match without any form of standard football kit, a portent of what was to follow. With the teams being so mismatched, it was likely that Arbroath would win easily, but even in those days when high scoring games were common the result was unprecedented.

Arbroath were 15–0 up by half time, and scored another 21 goals in the second half. The Scottish Athletic Journal at the time wrote The leather was landed between the posts 41 times, but five of the times were disallowed. Here and there, enthusiasts would be seen scoring sheet and pencil in hand, taking note of the goals as one would score runs at a cricket match." Referee Dave Stormont later claimed that had he taken a harder line with the Aberdeen team, Arbroath could have won 43–0. Stormont said: My only regret was that I chalked off seven goals, for while they may have looked doubtful from an offside point of view, so quickly did the Maroons carry the ball from midfield, and so close and rapid was their passing, that it was very doubtful whether they could be offside.  Other reports claim only 4 goals were chalked off.  It was claimed that Arbroath goalkeeper Jim Milne Sr did not touch the ball in the entire game and spent the whole of the match sheltering 
from the rain under a spectator's umbrella.

The 18-year-old John Petrie scored 13 goals, still the record for most goals scored in a senior tournament, although it was equalled by Archie Thompson when Australia beat American Samoa 31–0 on 11 April 2001 in a qualifier for the 2002 World Cup.

The unfortunate Bon Accord goal keeper on the day was Andrew Lornie.

Concurrent Dundee Harp match
On the same day, 18 miles (29 kilometres) away in Dundee, Dundee Harp were also playing in the first round of the Scottish Cup against Aberdeen Rovers. Dundee Harp beat Aberdeen Rovers 35–0. The referee noted 37 goals, but Harp's secretary suggested a miscount must have occurred as he had recorded only 35. The match official, acknowledging it was difficult for him to keep accurate details during such a deluge of goals, accepted the lower tally and wired the official score of 35–0 to the Scottish Football Association headquarters.

Bon Accord and Rovers had played each other the previous February, Bon Accord winning 5-3.

Aftermath
In the following rounds of the Scottish Cup, Arbroath beat local rivals Forfar Athletic 9–1 in the second round and Dundee East End 7–1 in the third round before losing 5–3 to Hibernian in the fourth round, scoring a total of 55 goals in that season's Scottish Cup.  Bon Accord did win a Cup tie in 1891-92, beating Stonehaven 8-0 away in the first round, but wound up at the end of the season.

To celebrate the historic achievement of the scoreline, the Angus MSP Andrew Welsh tabled a motion in the Scottish Parliament in 2000.

In December 2000 Romanian side Carpați Mârșa beat Avântul Dârlos 41–0, but the result was not ratified as it was not in a professional competition, so Arbroath maintained their record. A similar situation arose in May 2016, when Pelileo Sporting Club beat Indi Native 44–1 in an Ecuadorian third division match.

On 31 October 2002, the Malagasy club AS Adema beat SO l'Emyrne 149–0 in the national championship; while this has been claimed as the record for highest victory margin in a senior football competition, SOE intentionally scored own goals throughout the match as a protest to a refereeing decision in a prior match, meaning Arbroath holds the record margin of victory for a contested match in senior football.

On March 2012, amateur team Wheel Power F.C. won 58–0 against Nova 2010 F.C. to become the largest victory in British football; this eclipsed Illogan Reserves' 55–0 victory against Madron F.C. in the Cornish Mining League in November 2010.

On 2 August 2020, in the regional level of Polish Cup in Poznań, TPS II Winogrady beat Big Show FC 46–0, which is the record in official competition in Poland.

Match details

Notes and references

1885–86 in Scottish football
Scottish Cup matches
Arbroath F.C.
History of football in Scotland
Record association football wins
September 1885 sports events